O'Leary-Inverness is a provincial electoral district for the Legislative Assembly of Prince Edward Island, Canada. It was formerly known as West Point-Bloomfield from 1996 to 2007. It was created in 1996 from parts of 1st Prince and 2nd Prince.  It is notable for being the first district on the Island to ever elect a member of a third party to the legislature.

Members
The riding has elected the following Members of the Legislative Assembly:

Election results

O'Leary-Inverness, 2007–present

2016 electoral reform plebiscite results

West Point-Bloomfield, 1996–2007

References

 O'Leary-Inverness information

Prince Edward Island provincial electoral districts